This glossary of motion picture terms is a list of definitions of terms and concepts related to motion pictures, filmmaking, cinematography, and the film industry in general.

0–9

A

B

C

D

E

F

G

H

I

J

K

L

M

N

O

P

R

S

T

V

W

X

Z

See also

Film
Filmmaking
Cinematic techniques
Glossary of broadcasting terms
Glossary of video terms
Outline of film

References

External links
Movie Terminology Glossary at the Internet Movie Database

!
Film and video technology
Film production
Cinematic techniques
Filmmaking
Film and video terminology
Motion picture terms
Wikipedia glossaries using description lists